Joseph-Marie-Blaise Coulomb (Toulon, 5 July 1728 — La Seyne, 2 July 1803) was a French naval engineer.

Born to the Coulomb family of shipbuilders, Joseph-Marie-Blaise Coulomb studied in Toulon and later in the shipbuilding school founded by Duhamel du Monceau. He built over 19 ships for the French Royal Navy, and was ennobled on 6 February 1779 for his services.

Achievements 
 Magicienne-class frigates
 Centaure-class ships of the line
 Séduisant-class ships of the line
 Terrible-class ship of the line

Notes and references

Notes

References

Bibliography

External links 
  Joseph-Marie-Blaise Coulomb (1728-1803)
Solange Ami, Les maîtres constructeurs de la marine à Toulon au XVIIIe siècle, Mémoire en vue de la maîtrise d'histoire, Faculté des lettres et sciences humaines de Nice, 1974.
Éric Rieth, Le « Livre de construction des vaisseaux » (1683) du maître charpentier toulonnais François Coulomb (1654-1717).
Archives Nationales, série C/7/74, dossiers Coulomb.

1740 births
1831 deaths
French marine engineers
Place of birth missing